Larry Reynolds is an American college basketball coach, currently co-head coach at NCAA Division II Stanislaus State. Reynolds has previously been head coach at Cal State San Bernardino and Division I Long Beach State.

Reynolds played college basketball from UC Riverside, where he was named the California Collegiate Athletic Association (CCAA) Player of the Year in 1975. He began his coaching career at his alma mater, serving as an assistant coach to John Masi from 1979 to 1995. He moved up to the Division I University of San Francisco as an assistant, then secured his first head coaching job at Cal State San Bernardino in 1997. Reynolds led the Coyotes to a five-year record of 110–35 (.759), including four consecutive NCAA tournament appearances and four consecutive CCAA Coach of the Year awards. In 2001–02, Reynolds led the team to a 28–2 record.

He parlayed the season's success into a move to Division I, taking the reins at Long Beach State. Reynolds was at Long Beach for five seasons, amassing a record of 63–83. In his last season, Reynolds and Big West Conference Player of the Year Aaron Nixon won both the conference regular season and tournament championships. However, Long Beach State found NCAA violations occurring on Reynolds watch and following the 2006–07 season, Reynolds was fired.

In 2009, Reynolds was hired as head coach at California State University, Stanislaus (Stanislaus State). In 2017, it was announced that Reynolds was suffering from Parkinson's disease and that the school would hire a co-head coach to reduce his workload. Ultimately the school hired Paul Trevor of San Francisco State.

References

External links
UC Riverside Highlanders HOF bio

Living people
American men's basketball coaches
Azusa Pacific University alumni
Basketball coaches from California
Basketball players from California
Cal State San Bernardino Coyotes men's basketball coaches
College men's basketball head coaches in the United States
Long Beach State Beach men's basketball coaches
San Francisco Dons men's basketball coaches
Stanislaus State Warriors men's basketball coaches
UC Riverside Highlanders men's basketball coaches
UC Riverside Highlanders men's basketball players
American men's basketball players
Year of birth missing (living people)